Shukhrat Boboev (born 3 December 1985) is an Uzbekistani Paralympic judoka. He represented Uzbekistan at the 2016 Summer Paralympics in Rio de Janeiro, Brazil and he won the bronze medal in the men's 90 kg event.

At the 2017 Islamic Solidarity Games held in Baku, Azerbaijan, he won the gold medal in the men's 90 kg event.

References

External links 
 

1985 births
Living people
Uzbekistani male judoka
Paralympic judoka of Uzbekistan
Paralympic bronze medalists for Uzbekistan
Paralympic medalists in judo
Judoka at the 2016 Summer Paralympics
Medalists at the 2016 Summer Paralympics
Place of birth missing (living people)
21st-century Uzbekistani people